Katsiaryna Shkuratava (born 10 September 1987) is a Belarusian weighlifter. She competed at the 2013 World Championships in the Women's +75 kg, winning the Bronze medal but later lost medal and was banned from international competition by the International Weightlifting Federation for use of anabolic steroid Stanozolol.

References

Belarusian female weightlifters
1993 births
Living people
Doping cases in weightlifting
World Weightlifting Championships medalists